The Robinson Treaties are two treaties signed between the Ojibwa chiefs and The Crown in 1850 in the Province of Canada. The first treaty involved Ojibwa chiefs along the north shore of Lake Superior, and is known as the Robinson Superior Treaty. The second treaty, signed two days later, included Ojibwa chiefs from along the eastern and northern shores of Lake Huron, and is known as the Robinson Huron Treaty. The Wiikwemkoong First Nation did not sign either treaty, and their land is considered "unceded".

The Saugeen Surrenders of 1854 and the Pennefather Treaty of 1859 altered the original treaties.

Robinson Superior Treaty

The Robinson Treaty for the Lake Superior region, commonly called Robinson Superior Treaty, was entered into agreement on September 7, 1850, at Sault Ste. Marie, Ontario between Ojibwa Chiefs inhabiting the Northern Shore of Lake Superior from Pigeon River to Batchawana Bay, and The Crown, represented by a delegation headed by William Benjamin Robinson.   It is registered as the Crown Treaty Number 60.

Robinson Huron Treaty

The first Robinson Treaty for the Lake Huron region, commonly called Robinson Huron Treaty, was entered into agreement on September 9, 1850, at Sault Ste. Marie, Ontario, between Ojibwa Chiefs inhabiting the Northern Shore of Lake Superior from Batchawana Bay to Sault Ste. Marie and the Ojibwa Chiefs inhabiting the eastern and northern shores of Lake Huron from Sault Ste. Marie to Penetanguishene, and The Crown, represented by a delegation headed by William Benjamin Robinson. It is registered as the Crown Treaty Number 61.

These principal men on behalf of their respective Tribes or Bands, voluntarily surrendered, ceded, granted, and convey unto Her Majesty, her heirs and successors for ever, all their right, title, and interest to, and in the whole of, the territory above described, together with the Islands in the said Lakes, opposite to the Shores thereof, and inland to the Height of land which separates the Territory covered by the charter of the Honorable Hudson Bay Company from Canada; as well as all unconceded lands within the limits of Canada West to which they have any just claim, of the other part, save and except for the reservations set forth in the schedule.

The bands were given a one-time payment of  distributed amongst themselves, and an annual payment of £600 to each band.

The Schedule of Reservations created as a result of the Robinson Huron Treaty and signed by the subscribing Chiefs and Principal Men are as follows:

Reserve size

The First Nations signatories of this treaty were unfamiliar with the unit of the mile, and assumed it was the size of a league. The treaty gave each band a reserve of 16 square miles, which was much smaller than what the signatories expected. As soon as the error was noticed, the first nations notified the Crown of the issue, and surveyors corrected the problem except for a few reserves, such as the Gull Bay First Nation, considered too far and too remote. The Gull Bay First Nation filed a claim with the government of Canada on the issue of the size of their reserve in 2016.

Saugeen Surrenders

The second Robinson Treaty for the Lake Huron region, commonly called Surrender of the Saugeen Peninsula or Saugeen Surrenders, was entered into agreement on October 13, 1854, at Saugeen between Ojibwa Chiefs inhabiting the Saugeen (Bruce) Peninsula, led by Chief Waabadik, and the Crown, represented by a delegation headed by Laurence Oliphant. It is registered as the Crown Treaty Number 72.  Though not negotiated by William Benjamin Robinson, thus not a "Robinson Treaty", it is commonly included with them.

The Chippewas of Saugeen Ojibway Territory initially refused to relinquish entitlement of their Saugeen and Owen Sound Indian Reserve and negotiations for this land became increasingly difficult for the British government.  In the end the British government threatened that if the Ojibway did not agree the Crown would be unable to guarantee protection from the European settlers moving into the area.  After tense negotiations the Ojibway reluctantly agreed to surrender their reserve in exchange for "the interest on the principal sum arising out of the sale of the land".  Five smaller reserves were to be set aside in perpetuity:
 Saugeen Tract
 Chief's Point
 Owen Sound
 Cape Croker
 Colpoy's Bay

A historical plaque, erected by the Province of Ontario, provides the following summary of developments during that era. (Location: Allenford, picnic area on the south side of Highway 21 just west of Allenford Road.) The plaque reads as follows:

The lands have been distributed to the Chippewas' successor First Nations as follows:

Pennefather Treaty

The Pennefather Treaty was signed on 9 June 1859 at Gros Cap between the "Chiefs and Warriors of Batchewananny Bay and Goulais Bay Band of Indians", and the Crown. The chiefs and warriors agreed to relinquish to the Crown the reserved lands set aside in the Robinson Treaty (Reserve 15), save for Whitefish Island. The Crown, in return, would sell the land, and all interest accrued from the sale of the land would be distributed to band members annually. Each family could receive 40 acres of land on the Garden River reserve, and may purchase 80 acres of the land being sold at the selling price (with government-established conditions). The bands were also given $1,200 divided amongst themselves, and all "improvements" to the lands being sold could be compensated after survey.

List of Robinson Treaty First Nations

 Animbiigoo Zaagi'igan Anishinaabek First Nation (Robinson Superior)
 Atikameksheng Anishnawbek First Nation (Robinson Huron)
 Batchewana First Nation of Ojibways (Robinson Huron, Pennefather)
 Biinjitiwaabik Zaaging Anishinaabek First Nation (Robinson Superior)
 Bingwi Neyaashi Anishinaabek First Nation (Robinson Superior)
 Dokis First Nation (Robinson Huron)
 Fort William First Nation (Robinson Superior)
 Garden River First Nation (Robinson Huron)
 Gull Bay First Nation (Robinson Superior)
 Henvey Inlet First Nation (Robinson Huron)
 Long Lake 58 First Nation (Robinson Superior)
 Magnetawan First Nation (Robinson Huron)
 Michipicoten First Nation (Robinson Superior)
 Mississauga First Nation (Robinson Huron)
 Chippewas of Nawash Unceded First Nation (Saugeen Surrenders)
 Netmizaaggamig Nishnaabeg (Robinson Superior)
 Nipissing First Nation (Robinson Huron)
 Pays Plat First Nation (Robinson Superior)
 Ojibways of the Pic River First Nation (Robinson Superior)
 Red Rock Indian Band (Robinson Superior)
 Sagamok Anishnawbek First Nation (Robinson Huron)
 Saugeen First Nation (Saugeen Surrenders)
 Serpent River First Nation (Robinson Huron)
 Shawanaga First Nation (Robinson Huron)
 Sheshegwaning First Nation (Robinson Huron)
 Temagami First Nation (Robinson Huron)
 Thessalon First Nation (Robinson Huron)
 Wahnapitae First Nation (Robinson Huron)
 Wasauksing First Nation (Robinson Huron)
 Whitefish River First Nation (Robinson Huron)
 Whitesand First Nation (Robinson Superior)

Further reading
 
 
 
  and

Notes and references

Notes

References

External links
 
 
Manitoba Chiefs: First Nations Treaties with the British Crown

First Nations history in Ontario
1850 treaties
1854 treaties
Treaties of Indigenous peoples in Canada
History of the Great Lakes
History of Algoma District